Branston and Heighington railway station was a station in the village of Heighington, Lincolnshire, on the line between Lincoln and Sleaford.

References

Disused railway stations in Lincolnshire
Former Great Northern and Great Eastern Joint Railway stations
Railway stations in Great Britain opened in 1882
Railway stations in Great Britain closed in 1958